Reel 2 Real was an American hip house musical project that had seven top 10 hits on the Hot Dance Music/Club Play chart in the 1990s.

Biography
The project's core member was producer and DJ Erick Morillo from New York City, who spent a portion of his childhood living in Colombia and also in Union City, New Jersey. The first release as Reel 2 Real was "The New Anthem" which spent a week at No. 1 on the US Dance Chart in 1992.

Although it peaked at No. 8 on the dance chart, Reel 2 Real is best known for the song "I Like to Move It", which featured Trinidadian toaster Mark Quashie, also known as The Mad Stuntman. The song peaked at number 89 on the Billboard Hot 100 in 1994. On the 5th of April 1994 they played the famous FRIDGE LONDON BRIXTON on their Ciao Baby night. It was successful in Germany where it peaked at number 3 on the singles chart, in the United Kingdom, where it peaked at number 5 and in France and the Netherlands it peaked at number one. The song would later be used in 2005 animated film Madagascar and was covered by comedian Sacha Baron Cohen but produced by Morillo, making it a hit once again in 2005 with it becoming the film series' theme song. In all, The Mad Stuntman was featured on four of Reel 2 Real's top 10 dance hits. Later singles featured Barbara Tucker, Charlotte Small and Proyecto Uno. The Reel 2 Real alias was abandoned in 1997.

Morillo died of an overdose on September 1, 2020, aged 49.

Discography

Studio albums

Remix albums

Singles

See also
List of number-one dance hits (United States)
List of artists who reached number one on the US Dance chart

References

1992 establishments in New York City
1997 disestablishments in New York (state)
American electronic music groups
American dance music groups
Hip house music groups
American Eurodance groups
American house music groups
Reggae fusion groups
Musical groups established in 1992
Musical groups disestablished in 1997